William D. "Red" Stroud (May 2, 1941 – March 22, 2008) was an American basketball player who played briefly in the original American Basketball Association (ABA).

Stroud played college basketball at Mississippi State and briefly played for the New Orleans Buccaneers of the ABA. He played seven games for the Buccaneers during the 1967–68 season, averaging 2.9 points per game.  After the end of his professional career, Stroud coached high school basketball. Stroud died of leukemia on March 22, 2008.

References

1941 births
2008 deaths
American men's basketball players
Basketball players from Mississippi
Boston Celtics draft picks
Guards (basketball)
High school basketball coaches in the United States
Mississippi State Bulldogs men's basketball players
New Orleans Buccaneers players
People from Forest, Mississippi